Doa Aly (born 1976) is an Egyptian artist.

Early life and education
She was born in 1976, in Cairo, Egypt. She studied at the Faculty of Fine Arts at Helwan University in Cairo, and received her Bachelor of Fine Arts in fine arts and illustration in 2001.

Career

Aly's work includes illustration, painting, multimedia, and sculpture. Her work is inspired by "interest in aberrations of the human form, archaic literature, and classical dance."

Her work has appeared in galleries in the Middle East, Africa, and Europe. Her first show of her paintings was Pixel Series at the Mashrabia Gallery in Cairo, one of Cairo's first independent galleries. Her first European solo exhibition was held in Paris, France, in 2007 at Gallery Kamel Mennour. Her work has appeared as part of shows and festivals in the Dakar Biennale in Senegal, the Tate Modern museum in London, and Turkey's Istanbul Biennial. She was an artist in residence at the Makan contemporary art space, in Amman, Jordan.

Aly was featured in the student film Some Movements for Web Camera, funded by a grant provided through the National Film School of Denmark.

References

1976 births
Living people
21st-century Egyptian women artists
Artists from Cairo
Helwan University alumni
Egyptian contemporary artists
21st-century Egyptian artists